John Ashburton Thompson (1846 – 16 September 1915) was a British-Australian physician and an international authority on plague and leprosy.

Thompson, the eldest son of John Thompson, solicitor, was born in England in August 1846. He was educated at St Paul's School, and University College London, and qualified for the diplomas of the Royal College of Surgeons and Physicians. In 1878 he obtained the degree of M.D. with distinction at the Brussels University. From 1872 to 1878 he was surgeon at King's Cross to the Great Northern Railway Company, and also had a private practice. His health breaking down towards the end of 1878 from overwork, he went first to New Zealand and then to New South Wales.

He led an open-air life until his health was completely restored, and in 1883 was sent to Mackay to investigate an epidemic of dengue. Returning to Sydney in 1884 he was given the post of temporary medical officer to the Board of Health, and a year later was appointed its chief medical inspector and deputy medical adviser to the government of New South Wales. There was no public health act and his activities were therefore much restricted, but in 1896, having been made president of the board of health, he assisted Premier Sir George Reid in drafting a bill, which became law in November of that year. He also prepared all the necessary regulations which were still unchanged at the time of his death.

Thompson had taken much interest in leprosy and had visited Molokai and the Hawaiian Islands to investigate it. In 1896 he was awarded the prize offered by the national leprosy fund of Great Britain for the best history of leprosy. When there was an outbreak of Bubonic Plague in Sydney early in 1900, he was in charge of the measures taken to combat it, and wrote an elaborate and able Report on the Outbreak of Plague at Sydney, 1900, which was issued at the end of that year. Thompson appointed Frank Tidswell as Bacteriologist to the fledgling board. Thompson, Tidswell and William George Armstrong went on to produce important research on plague and are credited with developing 20th century scientific understandings of plague, in particular that Yersinia pestis is spread to humans by fleas from infected rats. Their work was a large part of a revolution of social medicine in Australia. The knowledge that infectious diseases could be spread from one human to another by insects and that infection could be derived from animals, brought public health into scientific scrutiny. The outbreak also led to further improvements being made to the North Head Quarantine Station as the value of segregating infected patients from the populace had been realised. They adopted the theory of the French doctor, Paul-Louis Simond, now generally accepted, that the disease was communicated to man by fleas from infected rats. His general conclusion was that "the best protection against epidemic plague lies in sufficient sanitary laws persistently and faithfully executed during the absence of the disease".

He delivered an address on plague at the 1906 meeting of the American Medical Association held at Boston, and was asked to write a description of the disease for Gould and Pyle's Cyclopedia of Medicine, issued in U.S.A. He retired on a pension in 1913 and died in London on 16 September 1915. He married a daughter of Sir Julian Salomons, who survived him.

References

Bibliography

1846 births
1915 deaths
Australian public health doctors
People educated at St Paul's School, London
Alumni of University College London